Leonid Sergeyevich Vasilyev (October 9, 1930, Moscow — October 6, 2016, Moscow) was a Soviet and Russian historian, social scientist, religious scholar, sociologist, orientalist (sinologist) and Doctor of Historical Sciences.

Vailyev was Head of the Laboratory of Historical Research and HSE (National Research University – Higher School of Economics) and until 2011, Head of the Department of General and National History and a professor. He began his tenure as the head of the sector of Theoretical Problems of the History of the East, then the Department of Oriental History of the Institute of Oriental Studies of the Russian Academy of Sciences and finally, the Institute's chief research officer.

He authored works devoted to the history and culture of China, the problems of Oriental studies and universal history - including the theory of the historical process - and the driving forces and dynamics of evolution. Among these works is a two-volume university textbook, History of the East, a six-volume textbook series on Universal History, monographs on the problems throughout ancient Chinese history, a textbook, History of Eastern Religions, and other books.

Basic work 
 Agrarian Relations and the Community in Ancient China (11th-7th centuries BC) (1961)
Cults, Religions, Traditions in China (1970); 2nd edition (2001)
 Problems of the Genesis of Chinese Civilization. Formation of the Foundations of Material Culture and Ethnicity (1976)
 Problems of the Genesis of the Chinese State (1983)
 History of Eastern Religions (1988)
Problems of the Genesis of Chinese Thought. Formation of the Foundations of Worldview and Mentality (1989)
 History of the East in 2 volumes (1993)
 Ancient China in 3 volumes
 Prehistory, Shan-Yin, Western Zhou (until the 8th century BC). (1995)
 Chunqiu Period (8th-5th centuries BC) (2000)
 The Zhangguo Period (5th-3rd centuries BC) (2006)
 East and West in History (Basic Parameters of Problematics) // Alternative ways to civilization (2000)
Evolution of the Society. Types of the Society and their Transformation (2011)
 Universal History in 6 volumes (2012-2013)
 History of Religions (2016)

References

External links
  Проблемы генезиса китайского государства
 Страница  на сайте  НИУ ВШЭ
 Леонид Васильев. Издательство КДУ

1930 births
Writers from Moscow
2016 deaths
Soviet historians
20th-century Russian historians
Soviet orientalists
Russian orientalists
Soviet sinologists
Russian sinologists
Moscow State University alumni
Academic staff of the Higher School of Economics
Academic staff of the Moscow State Institute of International Relations
Textbook writers
21st-century Russian historians